Malla Reddy engineering College (MREC) is the parent college of the Malla Reddy Group of Institutions, Hyderabad, Telangana, India founded by Shri Ch Malla Reddy.The institute was established in 2002, is approved by the AICTE New Delhi, and was affiliated to Jawaharlal Nehru Technological University, Hyderabad (JNTUH). In 2008 the college was accredited by NBA.The college has been certified by NAAC as an A grade institution in the Hyderabad region. The college has been granted Permanent Affiliation, and Autonomous status by JNTU in 2011.

Academic departments

Undergraduate Departments 
Department of Electronics and Electrical Engineering
Department of Mechanical Engineering
Department of Information Technology
Department of Electronics and Communication Engineering
Department of Computer Science and Engineering
Department of Mining Engineering (from 2013–14)
Department of Humanities And Sciences

Graduate departments

MBA 
Master of Business Administration Dept.

M.Tech 
Structural Engineering
Electrical Power Systems
Thermal Engineering
Machine Design
Computer Science and Engineering
Vlsi and Embedded Systems

NBA accreditation

The Undergraduate Programs of Electronics and Communication Engineering, Electrical and Electronics Engineering and Mechanical Engineering have been accredited by the National Board of Accreditation.

References

Engineering colleges in Hyderabad, India
All India Council for Technical Education
2002 establishments in Andhra Pradesh
Educational institutions established in 2002